Seillans is a commune in the Var department in the Provence-Alpes-Côte d'Azur region in southeastern France.

It is a ville perché (perched hill-top village) overlooking the plain between the southern Alps and the Esterel, which borders the sea between Cannes and Saint-Raphaël. It has been recognized by Les Plus Beaux Villages de France.

Seillans has a steeply-inclined medieval centre, accessible only on foot, and a number of small squares and old buildings. It is the westernmost of a line of such towns and villages (including Montauroux, Callian, Tourrettes and Fayence) that face south and attract tourists. Other local attractions include the nearby Lac de Saint-Cassien.

Seillans is also a destination for holiday-makers, retirees and second-home owners from other parts of France and northern Europe. Seillans features a castle and C13 church at its summit. Nearby are rustic chapels, vineyards, forests and olive groves.

Seillans has an annual pottery market and many concerts and events throughout the year, as well as the annual international Musique-Cordiale Festival, a fortnight when the church, the salle polyvalente and outdoor venues resound to a variety of high quality classical, choral and jazz music from international artists, soloists, choirs and orchestras each August, when the area is at its most popular.

In the late 1960s and early 1970s Max Ernst and Dorothea Tanning made Seillans their home. The village hosts a substantial Max Ernst collection, including several sculptures in open air.

Geography

Climate

Seillans has a hot-summer Mediterranean climate (Köppen climate classification Csa).

See also
Communes of the Var department

References

External links

  Seillans site
 Musique-Cordiale: the international classical music festival in the Var

Communes of Var (department)
Plus Beaux Villages de France